East Second Street Commercial Historic District may refer to:

 East Second Street Commercial Historic District (Hastings, Minnesota)
 East Second Street Commercial Historic District (Winona, Minnesota), a National Register of Historic Places listing in Winona County, Minnesota